Arina Ivanovna Rodionova (born 15 December 1989) is a Russian-born Australian tennis player.

Rodionova has won nine singles and 42 doubles titles on the ITF Women's Circuit. In 2007, she won the Australian Open girls' doubles title, partnering Evgeniya Rodina. On 23 October 2017, she reached a career-high singles ranking of world No. 116. On 27 July 2015, she peaked at No. 41 in the doubles rankings.

Elder sister Anastasia is also a tennis professional, and the two sisters have intermittently contested doubles tournaments together with modest success. Their most notable achievement as a team came at the 2010 Malaysian Open, in which they reached the final before losing to Chan Yung-jan and Zheng Jie in a super tie-break.

Career
Rodionova made her debut as a professional in 2004 at an ITF Women's Circuit event in Protvino, Russia. In 2005, she won a title in Minsk, followed by another win in Moscow the following year. In 2008, she finished as a runner-up in an ITF event in Istanbul. In 2009, Rodionova won two ITF titles in singles and eight in doubles.

In 2010, Rodionova defeated Jarmila Groth in the final of a $25k tournament in Burnie. In doubles, she advanced to the final of the WTA Tour-level Malaysian Open with her sister Anastasia. Although they defeated No. 1 seeds Alisa Kleybanova and Yan Zi along the way, the sisters lost the final match to Chan Yung-jan and Zheng Jie in close three sets.

At the 2011 Australian Open, Rodionova equalled her career-best showing at a Grand Slam tournament by qualifying for the main draw. She lost in the first round to fellow qualifier Anne Keothavong, 5–7, 4–6. She then won a $50k event in May in Prague, partnering Darya Kustova. She qualified for the Birmingham Classic, and won her first-round match against Virginie Razzano. She then notched the biggest win of her career by defeating No. 1 seed and world No. 16, Kaia Kanepi, in the second round. She lost to the 14th seed Magdaléna Rybáriková in the third round. At Wimbledon, Rodionova barely missed out on qualifying for the main draw by losing to Kristýna Plíšková, in three sets. She achieved very modest results through much of the rest of the year, losing in the first or second round of most tournaments she entered.

In 2012, Rodionova lost in the qualifying rounds of the Sydney International and the Australian Open. She then lost in the quarterfinals of the $25k Burnie International. She then competed in two more ITF events – losing in the second and first round, respectively. She picked up form in ITF Mildura, reaching the semifinals. Rodionova then competed in three more tournaments, losing in the second round of all three. She then failed to qualify in Copenhagen. Her best result of the year came at the WTA Tour clay-court event Morocco Open. She defeated Darija Jurak, Karolína Plíšková, and world No. 108, Mathilde Johansson, to qualify for the main draw. Each match lasted three sets. She took on Timea Bacsinszky in the first round, started well by winning the first set 6–2, but was forced to retire due a severe wrist injury she sustained while trailing 0–4 in the second set. She was also forced to withdraw from the doubles competition, where she and Anastasia were the No. 1 seeds. She missed a big part of the clay-court season to recover from the injury. Rodionova returned in July; she only made it past the first round in one of five ITF tournaments. However, she had a great result in Las Vegas, where she reached the semifinals. Following three more early exits, she reached the final of a $25k event in Traralgon, and followed this up by winning her next tournament in Bendigo. She finished the year with two more early-round losses in Toyota and Dubai.

World TeamTennis
Rodionova has played six seasons of World TeamTennis. In 2011, Rodionova was drafted by the Washington Kastles WTT Team, coached by Murphy Jensen. As a result of their 14-match win undefeated regular season, the Kastles secured the top seed in the Conference Championships where they beat the Boston Lobsters. In the WTT Finals, the Kastles defeated the St. Louis Aces to capture the 2011 WTT Championship for the second time in its four-year existence, completing the first ever 16–0 season in WTT 36-year history. Rodionova was named "Female Rookie of the Year" just prior to the Championship match and later WTT Finals MVP. She continued to play for the Kastles from 2012 to 2015, and joined the San Diego Aviators for a season in 2019. It was announced, she would be joining the Washington Kastles during the 2020 WTT season.

Personal life
Arina Rodionova was born to Ivan and Natalia Rodionova and lives in Melbourne with her sister Anastasia. She began playing tennis aged three, "I began playing tennis when I was almost three years old. And why exactly tennis? There wasn't any choice for me with my dad being a coach and my sister a professional tennis player, but in the end I think it's worked well!" Rodionova cites Martina Hingis as her role model, and also admires Justine Henin and Bob and Mike Bryan. She prefers hard courts and forehand as a shot.

Rodionova received Australian citizenship in January 2014 and married Australian rules footballer, Ty Vickery, in December 2015.

Grand Slam performance timelines

Singles

Doubles

WTA career finals

Doubles: 7 (1 title, 6 runner-ups)

WTA 125 tournament finals

Doubles: 1 (title)

ITF Circuit finals

Singles: 21 (9 titles, 12 runner–ups)

Doubles: 55 (42 titles, 13 runner–ups)

Junior Grand Slam finals

Girls' doubles: 1 (title)

Notes

References

External links

 
 
 
 

1989 births
Living people
Sportspeople from Tambov
Russian female tennis players
Australian female tennis players
Sportswomen from Victoria (Australia)
Russian emigrants to Australia
Grand Slam (tennis) champions in girls' doubles
Naturalised citizens of Australia
Naturalised tennis players
Tennis players from Melbourne
Olympic tennis players of Australia
Tennis players at the 2016 Summer Olympics
Australian Open (tennis) junior champions